Liqui Moly GmbH is a German company specializing in oils, lubricants and additives. As of January 1, 2018, Liqui Moly is part of the Würth Group which bought the remaining shares of the previous majority holder and CEO Ernst Prost. He now is the managing director of Liqui Moly, together with Günter Hiermaier.

Founding
Liqui Moly GmbH was founded in 1957 in Ulm on the river Danube. The patent for production of molybdenum disulfide (MoS2) formed the basis for the company.  This additive based on liquified molybdenum disulfide (MoS2) was the company's first product and gave the company its name. Molybdenum sulfide, the basic ingredient of the Liqui Moly Oil additive, was discovered in the shops of the US Army in post-war Germany . These shops sold a can under the brand name Liqui Moly that contained the liquified form of the solid lubricant molybdenum sulfide (MoS2). When added to motor oil, this substance ensures emergency running characteristics in the event of a sudden loss of oil. Fighter pilots in World War One had already exploited this property, adding MoS2 to the motor oil in the aircraft engines. This enabled pilots to still land, even if the oil tank was hit.

Products
Liqui Moly's main product is motor oil with MoS2 but there are also other lubricants with MoS2 and the additive MoS2 itself to be added by the end user during oil changes. Molybdenum disulfide enhances the lubrication quality of the oil and offers emergency operating features under harsh conditions.  It can be added to motor oils and to non-motor oils including gear oil, transmission oil or differentials oils. From this additive, an entire range was developed, with over 4,000 products including engine and gear oils, additives and vehicle care products, workshop equipment and service products. In Germany, Liqui Moly is one of the leading producers of engine oils. Germany remains the main marketplace, but international demands are increasing. Liqui Moly products are now sold in 120 countries.

Sponsoring

Motorsports
Liqui Moly is a sponsor of Engstler Motorsport and FCP Euro in the TCR touring car series. The Liqui Moly Team Engstler participates in TCR Asia, TCR Middle East and ADAC TCR Germany 2017. Since 2013, the company has partnered the motorcycle team Intact GP in the Moto2 class with riders Xavi Vierge and Marcel Schrötter.

Liqui Moly was a sponsor in veoautokross and for Mikk Mäesaar in the 2018-19 season.

The brand also entered the 2018 IMSA WeatherTech SportsCar Championship in partnership with Turner Motorsport, and participated at the 24 Hours of Daytona.

In July 2020, Liqui Moly became the official sponsor of Formula 1. The 3-year deal started at the 2020 Styrian Grand Prix and will run until the end of 2022 Formula 1 World Championship season. In March 2023, the sponsorship was extended for the 2023 season.

Other sports
Since 2017, the company has sponsored the Los Angeles Kings of the National Hockey League (NHL). The company has also been an official sponsor of the Men's Ice Hockey World Championships.

Since September 2018, Liqui Moly has been an official sponsor of the Chicago Bulls in the National Basketball Association (NBA).

In team handball, the company has been the title sponsor of two top European leagues, Germany's Handball-Bundesliga (since 2019) and France's Starligue (since 2021).

YouTube Channels

In February 2022 LM Performance, Liqui Moly UK’s motorsport, tuning and classic vehicle partner, teamed up with Minis and Motorbikes as their technical lubricant partner.

See also 
Lubricants
Internal combustion engine

References

External links
Liqui Moly homepage

Manufacturing companies established in 1957
German companies established in 1957
1957 establishments in West Germany
Companies based in Ulm
Motor oils
Manufacturing companies of Germany
German brands